Khön Könchok Gyalpo (1034-1102) was the founder of the Sakya School of Tibetan Buddhism, and the founder of Sakya Monastery. Khön Könchok Gyalpo was born in Sa'gya, Tsang. He was a member of the Khön family, and his ancestry can be traced back to Khön Dorje Rinpoche, student of Padmasambhava. He followed his father and brother and learned doctrines of the Nyingma School at a young age, but studied newly translated Vajrayāna texts with Drogmi Shakya Yeshe later. Khön Könchok Gyalpo established Sakya Monastery in 1073, where the Sakya Tradition first developed. His son Khön Kunga Nyingpo was regarded as the first leader of Sakya, and Khön Könchok Gyalpo is known as the first Sakya Trizin.

References 

 Ngawang Gongkar Sonam, transl. Chen Qingying (陈庆英), History of the Sakya Lineage (萨迦世系史), Lhasa, 西藏人民出版社: 1989.
 Chappel Tseten Püntsok, History of Tibet, Beijing, 五洲传播出版社: 2012.

Sakya Trizins
Tibetan people
11th-century Tibetan people
1034 births
1102 deaths